State Museum may refer to:

Alaska State Museum
Arizona State Museum
Azerbaijan State Museum of Musical Culture
Berlin State Museums
Bullock Texas State History Museum
Central State Museum of Kazakhstan
Connecticut State Museum of Natural History
Illinois State Museum
Indiana State Museum
Louisiana State Museum
Lower Saxony State Museum
Maine State Museum
Minnesota History Center Museum
New Jersey State Museum
Nevada State Museum (disambiguation)
Nevada State Museum, Carson City
Nevada State Museum, Las Vegas
New York State Museum
Pembina State Museum
Penang State Museum and Art Gallery
Perak State Museum
Pomeranian State Museum
Pushkin Museum
Sarawak State Museum
State Museum Hotwar
State Museum of Natural History Stuttgart
State Museum of Contemporary Art
State Museum of Zoology, Dresden
State Museum of Pennsylvania
Tennessee State Museum
Tsiolkovsky State Museum of the History of Cosmonautics
T. T. Wentworth, Jr. Florida State Museum
Tyrolean State Museum
University of Nebraska State Museum
Westphalian State Museum of Art and Cultural History
Wyoming State Museum